Dirk de Vos (born 15 June 1975) is a South African cricketer. He played First-class cricket and List A cricket matches for South Africa from 1992 to 2004.

References

External links
 

1975 births
Living people
South African cricketers
Cricketers from Pretoria